Myopias  is a genus of ants in the subfamily Ponerinae. The genus is known from the Oriental, Indo-Australian, and Australasian regions.

Species

Myopias amblyops Roger, 1861
Myopias bidens (Emery, 1900)
Myopias breviloba (Wheeler, 1919)
Myopias castaneicola (Donisthorpe, 1938)
Myopias chapmani Willey & Brown, 1983
Myopias concava Willey & Brown, 1983
Myopias conicara Xu, 1998
Myopias crawleyi (Donisthorpe, 1941)
Myopias cribriceps Emery, 1901
Myopias daia Xu, Burwell & Nakamura, 2014
Myopias delta Willey & Brown, 1983
Myopias densesticta Willey & Brown, 1983
Myopias emeryi (Forel, 1913)
Myopias gigas Willey & Brown, 1983
Myopias hania Xu & Liu, 2011
Myopias hollandi (Forel, 1901)
Myopias julivora Willey & Brown, 1983
Myopias kuehni (Forel, 1902)
Myopias latinoda (Emery, 1897)
Myopias levigata (Emery, 1901)
Myopias lobosa Willey & Brown, 1983
Myopias loriai (Emery, 1897)
Myopias luoba Xu & Liu, 2011
Myopias maligna (Smith, 1861)
Myopias mandibularis (Crawley, 1924)
Myopias mayri (Donisthorpe, 1932)
Myopias media Willey & Brown, 1983
Myopias menba Xu & Liu, 2011
Myopias modiglianii (Emery, 1900)
Myopias nops Willey & Brown, 1983
Myopias papua Snelling, 2008
Myopias philippinensis (Menozzi, 1925)
Myopias ruthae Willey & Brown, 1983
Myopias santschii (Viehmeyer, 1914)
Myopias shivalikensis Bharti & Wachkoo, 2012
Myopias tasmaniensis Wheeler, 1923
Myopias tenuis (Emery, 1900)
Myopias trumani (Donisthorpe, 1949)
Myopias xiphias (Emery, 1900)

References

External links

Ponerinae
Ant genera